Munishwar Dutt Upadhyay (3 August 1898 – 26 June 1983) was an Indian politician, statesman, and leader in the Indian independence movement. He was a Member of Parliament from Pratapgarh, Uttar Pradesh, belonging to the Indian National Congress.

Early life
He was born 3 August 1898 in Lakshmanpur Village, Lalganj Tehsil of Pratapgarh district, Uttar Pradesh, to Gazadhar Prasad Upadhyay. He was an exceptionally bright student and learner. He matriculated from Somvanshi Higher Secondary School (PB Inter College), Pratapgarh and did his post-graduation at Kayastha Pathshala, Allahabad, and law education from Allahabad University. Soon he started working with the mayor's office in Allahabad. He married Annapoorna Upadhyay in 1933.

Political life
He was a member of the Constituent Assembly of India and was the only person from Pratapgarh who signed the draft of the Indian Constitution. Post-independence, he became the first candidate from Pratapgarh to become a Member of Parliament twice, once in 1951 in the first Lok Sabha elections, then again in 1957 in the second Lok Sabha elections.

After sweeping wins in the first two elections from the Pratapgarh constituency, he was defeated in the third Lok Sabha election by Jan Sangh candidate, Ajit Pratap Singh.

He was secretary of the Congress Parliamentary Board and chairman of the Railway Reforms Committee. He also held the position of Revenue Minister in Uttar Pradesh Cabinet during C. B. Gupta's Chief Ministry for a short period between 1969 and 1970.

Literary works
 Kisan Sangathan
 Zamindari Pratha

Death
He died on 26 June 1983 in Pratapgarh and was survived by a son and two daughters.

Books & memoirs 

Ek aur Kaljyeyi
Belha ke laal by Dr. Dayaram Ratna Maurya

References

External links
Munishwar Dutt Upadhyay's profile on Lok Sabha
Ex-UPCC Presidents
List of MP's of 1st Lok Sabha Elections in India
List of MP's of 2nd Lok Sabha Elections in India

Further reading

 Angela S. Burger. Opposition in a Dominant Party System: A study of the Jan Sangh, the Praja Socialist Party and the Socialist Party in Uttar Pradesh, India. University of California Press, 1969. 
 Sadhna Sharma. States Politics in India Mittal Publications, 1995. , 9788170996194

People from Pratapgarh district, Uttar Pradesh
Indian National Congress politicians
Indian socialists
Indian independence activists from Uttar Pradesh
Members of the Constituent Assembly of India
1898 births
1983 deaths
Lok Sabha members from Uttar Pradesh
India MPs 1952–1957
India MPs 1957–1962